The Eclipse: A Memoir of Suicide is Antonella Gambotto-Burke's first memoir and fourth book. The narrative concerns her brother's suicide and the death of her ex-fiancé, Chicago-born GQ editor Michael VerMeulen. Featured on the cover of The Weekend Australian'''s review section on 20 March 2004, The Eclipse has been published in four languages and was released as Premium Content through the Lifestyle PodNetwork in 2008.

 Critical response 
Nicholas Humphrey, Professor of Philosophy at the London School of Economics, wrote, "I read The Eclipse through at one sitting, gripped as by Coleridge's Ancient Mariner. It's an astonishing, deep and beautiful book." And The Sunday Times (London) reviewer elaborated, "When they were both five, a blond boy with 'rueful eyes' asked Gambotto to marry him; at 16, he blew his brains out. Later, her lover, Michael VerMeulen, the editor of GQ magazine, overdosed on cocaine. Then in 2001, her brother gassed himself in a car. He left an apologetic note to his unknown discoverers, reassuring them that the gas was not explosive and asking the police to return the rented empty tank to the shop. He thought of everything - yet his family and friends were left only with a terrible perplexity. Gambotto's account is intense and moving, and she vividly captures her brother's troubled character."

In The South China Morning Post'', Annabel Walker decided that the book was "[h]onest, moving and reflective" and that "at its heart is intense grief." Gambotto-Burke "presents the hard facts, showing that during the past 45 years suicide rates worldwide have increased by 60 per cent ... [a] comfortingly honest account of the hellishness and black humour such events can bring ... Throughout the book, Gambotto asks: Does any man have the right to dispose of his own life? She supplies conflicting theories of philosophers and thinkers from Plato to the present ... She finds that the answer is no."

The American Association of Suicidology Magazine review concluded: "The Eclipse is recommended for anyone searching for the meaning of loss in his/her life, for the support and wisdom of another survivor, and for inspiration about life after loss. One of the most simple, yet powerful messages taken from The Eclipse is: 'In suffering, we are presented with opportunities to overcome. In overcoming, we inspire. In inspiring, we strengthen the collective will to live. There is no greater gift we can give ourselves.'"

References

External links 
Lucire review
Critique on Finnish translation
US review
An excerpt
The Eclipse Audiobook

2003 non-fiction books